Crasna may refer to:

Populated places:
 Crasna, Gorj, a commune in Gorj County, Romania
 Crasna, Sălaj, a commune in Sălaj County, Romania
 Crasna, a village in Sita Buzăului Commune, Covasna County, Romania
 Crasna, a village in Albeşti Commune, Vaslui County, Romania
 Crasna Vișeului, a village in Bistra Commune, Maramureș County, Romania 
 Crasna, the Romanian name for Krasne, Tarutyne Raion, Ukraine

Rivers: 
 Crasna (Tisza), a river in northwestern Romania and northeastern Hungary
 Crasna (Bârlad), a tributary of the Bârlad in Iași and Vaslui Counties
 Crasna (Buzău), a tributary of the Buzău in Covasna and Buzău Counties
 Crasna (Teleajen), a tributary of the Teleajen in Prahova County
 Crasna Veche, a river in northwestern Romania and northeastern Hungary

See also
 Kraszna County, an administrative division of the Kingdom of Hungary